O'Lone v. Estate of Shabazz, 482 U.S. 342 (1987), was a U.S. Supreme Court decision involving the constitutionality of prison regulations.  The court ruled that it was not a violation of the Free Exercise Clause of the First Amendment to deprive an inmate of attending a religious service for "legitimate penological interests."

Further reading

See also
 List of United States Supreme Court cases, volume 482
 List of United States Supreme Court cases
 Lists of United States Supreme Court cases by volume
 List of United States Supreme Court cases by the Rehnquist Court

External links

United States Supreme Court cases
United States Supreme Court cases of the Rehnquist Court
United States free exercise of religion case law
Imprisonment and detention in the United States
1987 in United States case law
1987 in religion